The Association of Religion Data Archives (ARDA) is a free source of online information related to American and international religion. One of the primary goals of the archive is to democratize access to academic information on religion by making this information as widely accessible as possible. Over 900 surveys, membership reports, and other data collections are currently available for online preview, and most can be downloaded free of charge. Other features include national profiles, GIS maps, church membership overviews, denominational heritage trees, historical timelines, tables, charts, and other summary reports.

Founded as the American Religion Data Archive in 1997, and online since 1998, the archive was initially targeted at researchers interested in American religion. In February 2006, the American Religion Data Archive became the Association of Religion Data Archives when an international data archive was added. The archive now includes both American and international collections as well as features for educators, journalists, religious congregations, and researchers.

Data included in the ARDA are submitted by the foremost religion scholars and research centers in the world. Currently housed in the Social Science Research Institute at Pennsylvania State University, the ARDA is funded by Lilly Endowment, the John Templeton Foundation, Chapman University, and Pennsylvania State University.

History
Roger Finke, then professor of sociology at Purdue University, founded the American Religion Data Archive in 1996 on a grant from Lilly Endowment. Data file collection and processing began in 1997. The online archive launched in the fall of 1998 under the domain name www.thearda.com, and originally contained thirty-three surveys regarding American religion. Within ten years, the archive had expanded to include more than 400 data files. , more than 900 data files were available for download on the ARDA website.

Starting in 2005, the ARDA began to host surveys dealing with religion outside the United States. In 2006, the archive therefore changed its name from the American Religion Data Archive to the Association of Religion Data Archives to more properly reflect the scope of information available. The new name preserved both the acronym and the domain name from the American Religion Data Archive.

Since its founding, the ARDA has moved from Purdue to the Population Research Institute at Pennsylvania State University, where is still run under the direction of Roger Finke, with the assistance of Christopher Bader of Chapman University. The staff has, since 1997, expanded to include a research team of religion experts and graduate students, a marketing and web development team, a team of editors for guiding papers and working papers, a learning center editor, and a press room editor.

Overview
The primary component of the ARDA, the data archive, contains around 775 quantitative data files . ARDA staff do not themselves collect the data encompassed in these files; rather, the surveys' principal investigators submit their data to the ARDA for processing and archiving. Thus, the data files currently included in the archive originate from almost 200 different sources. Major data file contributors include the Presbyterian Panel Survey, the Southern Focus Poll, the U.S. Congregational Life Survey, and the Middletown Area Study. Data from the General Social Survey, the American National Election Studies, the World Religion Dataset, and the Pew Research Center are also available. Among the most common topics of information included are public opinions regarding social issues (e.g. abortion, homosexuality, the role of women), survey respondents' perceptions of God/the divine, and survey respondents' religious affiliations.

In addition to archived survey data, the ARDA also provides information regarding the religious composition of, and the state of religious freedom in, the 232 nations currently recognized by the United States State Department; membership and distributional data and historical lineages ("Family Trees") of major world religions and U.S. denominations thereof; and various learning tools.

A bi-weekly journalistic article dealing with matters of religion and (usually American) public life, written by David Briggs, also appears on the ARDA website. This article is cross-posted to the Huffington Post, for which Briggs also writes.

In 2015, the ARDA began providing interactive historical timelines of religion in the United States. Currently, there are three interactive timelines listed: Prominent Religious Events and People, Baptist Events and People, and Catholic Events and People.

Affiliations
The ARDA is both affiliated with and funded by the following organizations:

 Lilly Endowment
 The John Templeton Foundation
 Pennsylvania State University
 Chapman University

The ARDA is affiliated with the following organizations without funding:

 The Association for the Study of Religion, Economics, and Culture
 The Bar Ilan University Religion and State Project
 The International Association of Religion Journalists
 The Portrait of American Life Survey

Awards and recognition
 The ARDA was one of thirty online resources selected by the Reference and User Services Association (RUSA) division of the American Library Association for the 2010 Best Free Reference Websites List. 
 The Lilly Endowment's "Insights into Religion" portal lists the ARDA as one of the best online resources for continuing education about religion, demographic research, youth research, and teaching religion.

See also
 Religion and the internet

References

External links
Association of Religion Data Archives

Online archives of the United States
American religious websites